State Route 138 (SR 138) is a  connecting route in Macon County, in the U.S. state of Alabama. The state highway connects Interstate 85 (I-85) with U.S. Route 80 (US 80) in the western part of the county. Victoryland, a greyhound track and now-closed casino are located immediately off I-85 at its exit with SR 138.

Route description
SR 138 begins at exit 22 of I-85 in the western part of Macon County, around the town of Shorter. Heading east past the diamond interchange with I-85, numerous truck stops, gas stations, fast food restaurants, and small stores line the roadway. After its junction with County Road 28, the highway ends at an intersection with US 80 where US 80 eastbound continues where SR 138 ends.

SR 138 is not mentioned on the exit signs from I-85.

Major intersections

See also

References

138
Transportation in Macon County, Alabama
State highways in the United States shorter than one mile